Schmalfuss (also given as Schmalfuß) is a surname and may apply to:

Albin Schmalfuß, whose drawings of mushrooms, first published in 1897, are frequently reprinted
Conny Schmalfuss, a German diver
Gernot Schmalfuß, oboist, member of Consortium Classicum, and director of the Evergreen Symphony Orchestra
Lothar Schmalfuss, claimed by one author to be the actual name of Muhammad
Peter Schmalfuss, a German classical pianist

Schmalfuss